K. S. Rama Rao is an Indian film producer known for his works in Telugu cinema.
Under his production house Creative Commercials, he has produced a number of notable films, including Mounageetam, Abhilasha (1983), Rakshasudu (1986), Swarnakamalam (1988), Chanti (1992), Matru Devo Bhava (1993).

Background
K. S. Rama Rao was born and brought up in Vijayawada, India, where his father was the owner of a textile business. As a child, Rama Rao would go to the nearby theatres to enjoy the films of the day. Vijayawada was a hub for the film industry, and many of his friends were sons of theatre owners, enabling him to see films for free. On a trip to Madras in 1967, Rama Rao was introduced to director K. Raghavendra Rao. By the end of 1970, Rama Rao had worked on three films with him.

Filmography
 World Famous Lover (2020) (presenter) 
 Tej - I love you (2018) (Producer)
 Kousalya Krishnamurthy (2019) (presenter)
 Shankara (2016) (presenter)
 Malli Malli Idi Rani Roju (2015) (presenter) 
 Dhammu (2012) (producer)
 Bujjigadu (2008) (producer)
 Chukkallo Chandrudu (2006) (producer)
 Veera Kannadiga (2004) (Kannada)
 Vasu (2002) (producer)
 Criminal (Telugu/Hindi Bilingual) (producer)
 Mathru Devo Bhava (1993 film) (Telugu/Hindi tulasi)
Babai Hotel (1992) (producer)
 Chanti (1992) (producer)
 Stuartpuram Police Station (1991) (producer)
 Mutyamantha Muddu (1989) (producer)
 Swarna Kamalam(1988)  (producer)
 Marana Mrudangam (1988) (producer)
 Rakshasudu (1986) (producer)
 Challenge (1984) (producer)
 Abhilasha (1983) (producer)

References

External links
 

Businesspeople from Vijayawada
Film producers from Andhra Pradesh
Living people
Telugu people
Telugu film producers
Year of birth missing (living people)